The 1920 Colorado gubernatorial election was held on November 2, 1920. Incumbent Republican Oliver Henry Shoup defeated Democratic nominee James M. Collins with 59.55% of the vote.

Primary elections
Primary elections were held on September 14, 1920.

Democratic primary

Candidates
James M. Collins

Results

Republican primary

Candidates
Oliver Henry Shoup, incumbent Governor
Robert H. Higgins, former Colorado State Treasurer

Results

General election

Candidates
Major party candidates
Oliver Henry Shoup, Republican
James M. Collins, Democratic

Other candidates
William Penn Collins, Farmer–Labor

Results

References

1920
Colorado
Gubernatorial